The French television series H was broadcast in 71 episodes over 4 seasons from October 24, 1998 to April 20, 2002. The series was created by Abd-el-Kader Aoun, Xavier Matthieu and Éric Judor.

The series narrative follows the life in a hospital located in Trappes (near Paris), where three employees, Djamel (Jamel Debbouze), Aymé (Éric Judor) and Sabri (Ramzy Bedia) have their own special conception of work.

Overview

Episodes

Season 1: 1998–1999 

H